The Alstom Metropolis C751A is the first generation of communications-based train control (CBTC) electric multiple unit rolling stock in operation on the North East line of Singapore's Mass Rapid Transit (MRT) system since 2003. 25 trainsets were purchased for the line.

Operational history and overview
Initiated in 1997 when the North East Line was under construction, Alstom was awarded as C751A contract to supply for the trains for North East line. The trains were part of the Metropolis family of the urban EMU trains. Unlike all other MRT lines, it draws power from the  overhead catenary, which is unique and whereas, this traction power use is optional in Singapore's rail network.

Also, it is the first to have seats of the same colour in every compartment of the trains, together with the first fully driverless rolling stock in Singapore. SBS Transit hires rover employees to drive trains manually. For Alstom, it uses the URBALIS 300 moving-block communications-based (CBTC) Automatic Train Control (ATC) system, which optimizes headway and enables extra trains to be injected automatically into the system at rush hour to increase passenger capacity and reduce congestion. In the depot, trains are also operated in full automatic mode. Communication between the train and the fixed signaling equipment is enabled by the IAGO two-way continuous transmission system. Station-based automatic train supervision ensures a greater degree of availability. Built-in test equipment has also been included, and Eurobalise standards have been adopted for spot transmission.

This rolling stock is the first to have seats of the same colour in every compartment of the train, which is the uniform colour of beige and purple. Trains also has two side windows at each end for viewing the tracks. The exterior of the C751A trains are black together with red and purple stripes, similar to C751C only. C751A trains do not have a middle window cut out unlike the newer driverless trains in the MRT system. This is because it has to make way for the old detrainment ramp, which is not as bigger as that of the C751C, C830, C830C and the upcoming C851E.

Platform gap reducers were since added to all C751A trains, similar to those on the C830C and C751C.

All C751A trains consists of the Visual Passenger Information System (VPIS). These displays show the name of the next station, current station, door closing messages and occasionally the date and time. Also, some of the C751A trains has been installed with four rows for standing area since 2015.

Refurbishment
In December 2018, LTA announced that the C751A trains will undergo mid-life refurbishment works from 2019 onwards. A contract worth $116.7 million was awarded to CRRC Nanjing Puzhen for the refurbishment works. All 25 first-generation C751A trains will be upgraded. The trains' interior, such as seats, panels, and flooring, will be replaced. The current 6 LCD screens on the side panels (which formerly showed rail travel information of the next station and terminating station, silent commercials and safety videos) above some seats had already been deactivated and was removed in refurbished trains. However, a new LTA LCD Dynamic Route Map Display (DRMD) located above each doors will be retrofitted. These DRMDs will be similar to that on newer MRT trains such as the CT251 and upcoming R151. In addition, Air-conditioning & ventilation systems will be upgraded.

The exterior livery design will be retained with the exception of Land Transport Authority logos. Smaller SBS Transit logos are located on the gangway ends of each car in a similar fashion to LTA's earlier corporate livery designs. Works are expected to be completed by 2024.

The first refurbished train set (7013/7014) entered passenger service on 28 February 2022.

Train Formation
The configuration of a C751A in revenue service is DT–Mp–Mi+Mi–Mp–DT

The car numbers of the trains range from 7x001 to 7x050, where x depends on the carriage type. Individual cars are assigned a five-digit serial number by the rail operator SBS Transit. A complete six-car trainset consists of an identical twin set of one driving trailer (DT) and two motor cars (Mi & Mp) permanently coupled together. For example, set 7013/7014 consists of cars 71013, 72013, 73013, 73014, 72014 and 71014.

 The first digit is always a 7.
 The second digit identifies the car number, where the first car has a 1, the second has a 2 & the third has a 3.
 The third digit is always a 0.
 The fourth digit and fifth digit are the train identification numbers. A full-length train of 6 cars have 2 different identification numbers. For example, 7013/7014 (normal coupling) or 7011/7022 (cross coupling).
 Alstom built sets 7001/7002-7049/7050.

References

External links

Mass Rapid Transit (Singapore) rolling stock
Alstom multiple units
Train-related introductions in 2003
1500 V DC multiple units